POP Telecom is a UK based telecommunications and internet service provider (ISP) founded in 2011, with headquarters based in Romford, as a small company, they are not required to publicise turnover.

POP Telecom supply both line, broadband and mobile services to both domestic and commercial markets. POP Telecom's motto is “simply communicating by communicating simply”. POP Telecom are currently planning to expand on a multinational level.

In 2013, The POP Group was launched with an expansion in to the Business Energy Sector. POP Energy continues growing exponentially in the online and outbound world, with their goals prioritised in saving money on utility bills.

References

External links 

Romford
Telecommunications companies established in 2011
Telecommunications companies of the United Kingdom
2011 establishments in England